The Brazilian Republic is the full name of Brazil.

Brazilian Republic may also refer to:
 First Brazilian Republic
 Second Brazilian Republic
 Third Brazilian Republic
 Fourth Brazilian Republic
 Fifth Brazilian Republic
 Sixth Brazilian Republic